Roma Street may refer to:
 Roma Street, Brisbane, a street in the centre of Brisbane, Queensland, Australia
Roma Street busway station in Brisbane, Australia
Roma Street Parkland in Brisbane, Australia
Roma Street railway station in Brisbane, Australia